In the context of transit in New York state, the Orange Line may refer to:

 Any New York City Subway service that uses the IND Sixth Avenue Line and its branches:
 B Sixth Avenue Express
 D Sixth Avenue Express
 F Sixth Avenue Local
 M Sixth Avenue Local
 The former V Sixth Avenue Local
 The Journal Square–33rd Street route of the PATH Train
 The Long Beach Branch of the Long Island Rail Road
 The Port Jervis Line of the Metro-North Railroad